Steve Mapsalak (born March 17, 1957) is a Canadian politician, who served as a Member of the Legislative Assembly (MLA) in the Legislative Assembly of Nunavut.

He first won the Akulliq seat in the 2004 Nunavut election.

According to preliminary results, he was narrowly defeated by John Ningark in the 2008 election. A judicial recount was conducted, but resulted in Ningark and Mapsalak each receiving exactly 157 votes, thus forcing a new vote. In the revote on March 2, Ningark defeated Mapsalak by a margin of 193 to 179.

In the 2013 election, Mapsalak was re-elected to the legislature, defeating Johnny Ningeongan in the redistributed district of Aivilik. Mapsalak was previously the mayor of Repulse Bay, and also the chair of the board of governors for Nunavut Arctic College.

References

External links
Steve Mapsalak at the Legislative Assembly of Nunavut

1957 births
Living people
Inuit from the Northwest Territories
Inuit politicians
Members of the Legislative Assembly of Nunavut
Mayors of places in Nunavut
People from Naujaat
21st-century Canadian politicians
Inuit from Nunavut